Sait Idrizi (born 26 April 1990) is a Slovenian football midfielder who currently plays for

External links
Player profile - NK Olimpija Ljubljana
Player profile - PrvaLiga

1990 births
Living people
Slovenian footballers
NK Olimpija Ljubljana (1945–2005) players
Association football midfielders